Saint-Tugdual is a commune in the Morbihan department of Brittany in north-western France. Inhabitants of Saint-Tugdual are called in French Tugdualais.

Geography

Historically, the village belongs to Vannetais and Pays Pourlet.

Map

See also
Communes of the Morbihan department

References

External links

 Mayors of Morbihan Association 

Sainttugdual